Auletta is a town in Italy.

Auletta may also refer to:
 Auletta (band), a German rock band
 Auletta (sponge), a genus of sponges
 Auletta, a genus of spiders, synonym of Macrargus
 Auletta (surname), including a list of people with the name

See also 
 Oletta, a commune in Corsica